St. Paul's Primary School may refer to:

St. Paul's Co-educational (Kennedy Road) Primary School, Hong Kong
St. Paul's Co-educational (Macdonnell Road) Primary School, Hong Kong
St. Paul's Primary School Bentleigh, Bentleigh, Melbourne, Victoria, Australia

See also
 St. Paul's School (disambiguation)
 Saint Paul (disambiguation)